The 2021 Western Athletic Conference softball tournament was held at Logan Field on the campus of Seattle University in Seattle, Washington from May 13 through May 15, 2021. The tournament was won by the Seattle Redhawks, who earned the Western Athletic Conference's automatic bid to the 2021 NCAA Division I softball tournament

Tournament

Bracket

References

Western Athletic Conference softball tournament
Western Athletic Conference softball tournament